HaBigbagim (Hebrew: הביגבגים, English: The Big Bug Show) is an Israeli educational television program for preschoolers, which aired on the Israeli children's channel Arutz HaYeladim between 1998 and 2000.
The big bugs are five puppet insects who broadcast in a self-made TV station. Throughout the show they talk and learn about colors, imagination, friendship, responsibility etc. and also sing songs.

The names of the characters based by jazz musicians like: Dizzy (Dizzy Gillespie), Louis (Louis Armstrong), Ella (Ella Fitzgerald), Billie (Billie Holiday) and Chick (Chick Corea).

The puppets were designed by Shai Charka, but were created in the United Kingdom.

That show has a huge success in Israel, in result that show sold to several countries like the United Kingdom, Brazil, Mexico, Portugal and Singapore.

Characters 

 Dizzy: A male butterfly, with all the impish charm of a six-year-old. Curious, kind-hearted, and extremely sensitive, he can always get a laugh out of his friends. 
 Billie: A female ant, Her enthusiasm for whatever she does is contagious, and she can always get Dizzy to join her on a new adventure. Billie loves to appear on stage, whether it's singing, acting or hosting the show. 
 Chick: A male grasshopper, The anchorman of the Bug News Network, Chick's antennae will suddenly pop up, telling him that a news story is brewing.
 Louis: A baby caterpillar, He still has lots to learn, though, and if it weren't for his sweet grin and good intentions, some of the other bugs might actually get mad at him.
 Ella: A female beetle, She's a talented scientist and recycling expert, but deep down she would also like to be a star and always hums with her record player.

External links

Israeli children's television series
Israeli television shows featuring puppetry
Puppets
Television series about insects
1990s Israeli television series
2000s Israeli television series
1998 Israeli television series debuts
2000 Israeli television series endings